Jack T. Hebden (born 1900) was an English professional footballer who played as a right back.

Career
Born in Castleford, Hebden played for Castleford Town, Bradford City, West Ham United and Fulham.

For Bradford City he made 3 appearances in the Football League.

References

External links

1900 births
Year of death missing
English footballers
Castleford Town F.C. players
Bradford City A.F.C. players
West Ham United F.C. players
Fulham F.C. players
English Football League players
Association football fullbacks
Sportspeople from Castleford